Mohler is an unincorporated community in Lincoln County, Washington, United States. Mohler has a post office with ZIP code 99154.

Climate
According to the Köppen Climate Classification system, Mohler has a semi-arid climate, abbreviated "BSk" on climate maps.

References

Unincorporated communities in Lincoln County, Washington
Unincorporated communities in Washington (state)